Numan Kurdić (born 1 July 1999) is a Bosnian professional footballer who plays as a centre-back for Serbian club Novi Pazar on loan from the Belgian club RWDM, and the Bosnia and Herzegovina national team.

Club career

Sarajevo
Kurdić started off his senior career at Sarajevo after playing in the youth team of Velež Mostar and Sarajevo before. He made his debut for Sarajevo on 28 July 2018, in a 4–0 home league win against Mladost Doboj Kakanj. He won his first trophy with the club on 15 May 2019, after Sarajevo beat Široki Brijeg in the final and won the 2018–19 Bosnian Cup. Three days after the cup final, on 18 May 2019, Kurdić also won the league title with Sarajevo after the club beat Zvijezda 09 4–0 at home.

He won his second league title with the club on 1 June 2020, though after the 2019–20 Bosnian Premier League season was ended abruptly due to the COVID-19 pandemic in Bosnia and Herzegovina and after which Sarajevo were by default crowned league champions for a second consecutive time.

On 9 July 2020, Kurdić was sent on a season-long loan to Serbian SuperLiga club Novi Pazar.

On 27 January 2021, he was sent on a half-season-long loan to Albanian Kategoria Superiore club Kukësi.

RWDM
On 17 January 2022, Kurdić signed a contract with Belgian First Division B club RWDM for a reported €150.000 transfer fee.

On 17 December 2022, Kurdić returned to Novi Pazar on a six-months loan.

Career statistics

Club

International

Honours
Sarajevo
Bosnian Premier League: 2018–19, 2019–20 
Bosnian Cup: 2018–19

References

External links
Numan Kurdić at Sofascore

1999 births
People from Tešanj
Living people
Association football central defenders
Bosnia and Herzegovina footballers
Bosnia and Herzegovina international footballers
FK Sarajevo players
FK Novi Pazar players
FK Kukësi players
RWDM47 players
Premier League of Bosnia and Herzegovina players
Serbian SuperLiga players
Kategoria Superiore players
Challenger Pro League players
Bosnia and Herzegovina expatriate footballers
Expatriate footballers in Serbia
Bosnia and Herzegovina expatriate sportspeople in Serbia
Expatriate footballers in Albania
Bosnia and Herzegovina expatriate sportspeople in Albania
Expatriate footballers in Belgium
Bosnia and Herzegovina expatriate sportspeople in Belgium